Kazakhstan took part in the Junior Eurovision Song Contest 2021. The Kazakh entrant for the 2021 contest in Paris, France was selected through a national selection, organised by the Kazakh broadcaster Khabar Agency (KA). The semi-final took place online between 8 and 12 October 2021, while the final took place on 6 November 2021.

Alinur Khamzin and Beknur Zhanibekuly were selected to represent Kazakhstan with the song "Ertegı älemı (Fairy World)".

Background

Prior to the 2021 contest, Kazakhstan's highest placing in the contest was in 2019 and 2020, represented by Yerzhan Maxim with the song "Armanyńnan qalma" and Karakat Bashanova with the song "Forever", respectively, both achieving second place.

As Khabar Agency (KA) is not an active member of the European Broadcasting Union (EBU), the broadcaster requires a special invitation from the EBU to participate in Eurovision events. Channel 31 had previously expressed their ambitions to debut in the 2018 contest, and had sent a delegation to the  contest.

Before Junior Eurovision

National final 
Kazakhstan's participation in the 2021 contest was confirmed in September 2021, having been invited to participate by the European Broadcasting Union (EBU). Khabar announced during a press conference on 29 September 2021 that artists will be able to submit their applications for the national final until 6 October 2021. From all applications submitted, a jury panel selected 30 acts for the online semi-final. The jury consisted of Khamit Shangaliev (composer of the 2019 and 2020 Kazakh entries), Madina Sadvakasova (singer), Beksultan Kenishkaliev (singer and participant in the 2020 Slavianski Bazaar), Kanat Aytbayev (singer and producer), Yerlan Bekchurin (producer and composer) and Karlygash Abdikarimova (cultural worker and participant in the Slavianski Bazaar).

Semi-final 
The online semi-final took place between 8 and 12 October 2021 where users were able vote for their favorite artists on Khabar's official website. The top ten acts with the most votes proceeded to the televised national final.

Final 
The final took place on 6 November 2021 in Nur-Sultan, where ten acts performed their candidate Junior Eurovision songs written for them by composers directly invited by Khabar in a televised production. The winner was determined by a 50/50 combination of both public telephone vote and the votes of jury members made up of music professionals. Beknur Zhanibek and Alinur Khamzin were tied for the first place and the tie was to be decided by the jury, however after consultation with the composers of both songs it was ultimately decided that Zhanibek and Khamzin would both represent Kazakhstan with the song "Ertegı älemı", retitled as "Ertegı älemı (Fairy World)".

Artist and song information

Alinur Khamzin and Beknur Zhanibekuly 

Alinur Khamzin and Beknur Zhanibekuly are a Kazakh pop music duo, also known as Alinur & Beknur that represented Kazakhstan at the Junior Eurovision Song Contest 2021 with the song " (Fairy World)".

Alinur Khamzin was born in the city of Oral, West Kazakhstan Region, and alongside singing, he is interested in robotics, plays the piano and chess. Aside from the Junior Eurovision Song Contest, Alinur has participated in several singing contests in Kazakhstan. He was a finalist in the national children's song contest Bala Dauysy – 2018, finalist of the national selection Slavianski Bazaar – 2021 and also at the III children's vocal competition Baqytty Bala – 2021 initiated by Dimash Kudaibergen.    

Beknur Zhanibekuly was born in Astana (now Nur-Sultan), Kazakhstan. Despite holding Kazakhstani citizenship, he currently lives in Strasbourg, France and speaks no less than four languages, having fluency in French, English, Kazakh, and Russian. Alongside singing, he loves music and making new friends. Zhanibekuly was born with phocomelia.

Ertegı älemı (Fairy World) 

""  is a song by Kazakh child singers Alinur Khamzin and Beknur Zhanibekuly. It is composed by Nurbolat Qanay, and lyricised by Nurbolat Qanay, Gabriel Boileau Cloutier and translated into French by Cloutier. A revamped version of the song was unveiled on 26 November 2021 together with its official music video.

It represented Kazakhstan in the Junior Eurovision Song Contest 2021 in Paris, France. The song came in 8th place with 121 points.

At Junior Eurovision
After the opening ceremony, which took place on 13 December 2021, it was announced that Kazakhstan would perform tenth on 19 December 2021, following Armenia and preceding Albania.

At the end of the contest, Kazakhstan received 121 points, placing 8th out of 19 participating countries.

Voting

Detailed voting results

References

Kazakhstan
2021
Junior Eurovision Song Contest